Henri-Léon-Gustave-Charles Bernstein (20 June 1876 – 27 November 1953) was a French playwright associated with Boulevard theatre.

Biography
Bernstein was born in Paris. His earliest plays, including La Rafale (1905), Le Voleur (1907), Samson (1908), Israël (1908), and Le Secret (1913), are written in a realistic style and powerfully depict harsh realities of modern life and society.

The far-right royalist Camelots du Roi youth organization of the Action française organized an anti-Semitic riot against a production of one of his plays in 1911. During the Second World War, he fled to the United States and lived in New York City at the Waldorf Astoria. Jean-Pierre Aumont relates in his work Le Soleil et les Ombres (Robert Laffont, 1976) the luxury in which he lived, as well as his general lack of interest in the war.

He is buried in the Cimetière de Passy in Paris.

Works
Le Marché (The Market), 1900 
Le Détour, 1902
Joujou, 1902
Le Bercail, 1904
La Rafale (Whirlwind), 1905
La Griffe, La Renaissance, 1906
Le Voleur (The Thief), 1906
Samson, 1907
Israël, 1908
Après moi (After Me), 1911
L'Assaut (The Assault), 1912
Le Secret, 1913
The Claw
L'Élévation, 1917
Judith, 1922
La Galerie des glaces (The Hall of Mirrors), 1924
Félix, 1926
Mélo, 1929
Le Bonheur (Happiness), 1933
Le Cœur (The Heart), 1936
Le Messager, 1937
Elvire, 1939
La Soif (The Thirst), 1949
Victor, 1950
Evangéline, 1952
Espoir (Hope), 1955
Le Venin (The Poison), 1927

Filmography
The Thief, directed by Edgar Lewis (Silent film, 1914, based on the play Le Voleur)
Samson, directed by Edgar Lewis (Silent film, 1915, based on the play Samson)
Sold, directed by Edwin S. Porter and Hugh Ford (Silent film, 1915, based on the play Le Secret)
, directed by Marcel L'Herbier (Silent film, 1919, based on the play Le Bercail)
, directed by Telemaco Ruggeri (Silent film, 1920, based on the play L'Élévation)
, directed by Jacques de Baroncelli (Silent film, 1920, based on the play La Rafale)
Shackles of Gold, directed by Herbert Brenon (Silent film, 1922, based on the play Samson)
Samson, directed by Torello Rolli (Silent film, 1923, based on the play Samson)
The Washington Masquerade, directed by Charles Brabin (English, 1932, based on the play La Griffe)
Dreaming Lips, directed by Paul Czinner (German, 1932, based on the play Mélo)
''Mélo, directed by Paul Czinner (French, 1932, based on the play Mélo)
, directed by Maurice Tourneur (French, 1933, based on the play Le Voleur)
Le Bonheur, directed by Marcel L'Herbier (French, 1934, based on the play Le Bonheur)
, directed by Robert Land and Giorgio Simonelli (Italian, 1934, based on the play Mélo)
Samson, directed by Maurice Tourneur (French, 1936, based on the play Samson)
, directed by Pierre-Jean Ducis (French, 1936, based on the play L'Assaut)	
Dreaming Lips, directed by Paul Czinner (English, 1937, based on the play Mélo)
The Messenger, directed by Raymond Rouleau (French, 1937, based on the play Le Messager)
Orage, directed by Marc Allégret (French, 1938, based on the play Le Venin)
Victor, directed by Claude Heymann (French, 1951, based on the play Victor)
Dreaming Lips, directed by Josef von Báky (German, 1953, based on the play Mélo)
, directed by Giorgio Capitani and Pierre Billon (Italian, 1954, based on the play Le Venin)
Mélo, directed by Alain Resnais (French, 1986, based on the play Mélo)

References

External links
 
 

1876 births
1953 deaths
Writers from Paris
20th-century French dramatists and playwrights
19th-century French Jews
Jewish dramatists and playwrights
Burials at Passy Cemetery